The 1981 Amstel Gold Race was the 16th edition of the annual road bicycle race "Amstel Gold Race", held on Sunday April 2, 1981, in the Dutch province of Limburg. The race stretched 237 kilometres, with the start in Heerlen and the finish in Meerssen. There were a total of 160 competitors, and 60 cyclists finished the race.

Result

External links
Results

Amstel Gold Race
April 1981 sports events in Europe
1981 in road cycling
1981 in Dutch sport
1981 Super Prestige Pernod